Karol Wojciech Kozuń (born 23 March 1982) is a Paralympian track and field athlete from Poland competing mainly in category F55 throwing events. He competed in two Summer Paralympics winning a silver medal in the discus at the 2012 Summer Paralympics in London.

Personal career
Kozuń was born in Sieradz, Poland in 1982. In 2005 he suffered a broken spine after a traffic accident.

References 

Living people
1982 births
People from Sieradz
Polish male shot putters
Polish male javelin throwers
Track and field athletes with disabilities
Paralympic athletes of Poland
Paralympic silver medalists for Poland
Athletes (track and field) at the 2008 Summer Paralympics
Athletes (track and field) at the 2012 Summer Paralympics
Medalists at the 2012 Summer Paralympics
Paralympic medalists in athletics (track and field)
20th-century Polish people
21st-century Polish people